The  frazione San Pelino is a medieval town in the Avezzano comune. It lies within the province of L'Aquila, Abruzzo region, in the Apennine Mountain Range of central Italy.

The population is about 1,800.

Frazioni of Avezzano